Sasunaga tenebrosa is a moth of the family Noctuidae first described by Frederic Moore in 1867. It is found from the Indian subregion, Sri Lanka to Sundaland, the Philippines and Sulawesi.

Description
Its wingspan is about 36–42 mm. Body dark and reddish brown or black and grey. Forewings with slight streaks in the interspaces. The transverse lines are almost obsolete. Orbicular small, circular, and usually prominent, whereas reniform almost obsolete. There is a dark patch on costa before apex. Apical and basal inner area and angle often greyish or reddish brown. Hindwings fuscous brown.

Ecology
The larvae feed on Ventilago species, and the caterpillar pupates in the soil in a silk cocoon.

References

Hadeninae
Moths of Asia